The ARIA Albums Chart ranks the best-performing albums and extended plays (EPs) in Australia. Its data, published by the Australian Recording Industry Association, is based collectively on the weekly physical and digital sales and streams of albums and EPs. In 2023, seven albums have so far claimed the top spot. The first number one of the year, Midnights by Taylor Swift, carried over from the end of 2022. One artist, SZA, achieved their first number-one album.

Chart history

Number-one artists

See also
 2023 in music
 List of number-one singles of 2023 (Australia)

References

2023
Australia albums
Number-one albums